Aundre Jackson (born November 15, 1995) is an American professional basketball player for Sparta Bertrange of the Total League.

Early life
Jackson was born in Fort Worth, Texas and grew up in Kennedale and was a star player at Kennedale High School.

College career
Jackson started his college career with McLennan Community College in 2014 before transferring to Loyola University Chicago in 2016. In 2017 he was named the Missouri Valley Conference's Sixth Man of the Year. In 2018, he made it to the Final Four of the NCAA tournament.

Club career
In July 2018, Jackson signed with Skallagrímur of the Úrvalsdeild karla. In 22 league games for Skallagrímur, he averaged 19.9 points and 8.3 rebounds.

References

External links
Loyola Ramblers bio
Mclennan Athletics bio
Profile at realgm.com
Icelandic statistics at Icelandic Basketball Association

1995 births
Living people
American expatriate basketball people in Iceland
American men's basketball players
Basketball players from Texas
Junior college men's basketball players in the United States
Loyola Ramblers men's basketball players
McLennan Community College alumni
People from Tarrant County, Texas
Skallagrímur men's basketball players
Small forwards
Sportspeople from the Dallas–Fort Worth metroplex